Ceratogomphus, commonly known as thorntails, is a small genus of dragonfly in the family Gomphidae found in southern Africa.
The genus contains only two species:

Ceratogomphus pictus  – common thorntail
Ceratogomphus triceraticus  – cape thorntail

References

Gomphidae
Anisoptera genera
Taxa named by Edmond de Sélys Longchamps
Taxonomy articles created by Polbot